La Boissière-de-Montaigu (literally La Boissière of Montaigu) is a commune in the Vendée department in the Pays de la Loire region in western France.

History
Within the border of the commune, axes, potteries and engraved rocks attest to the presence of man between 3500 and 2800 BC.

Places of interest
Château d' Asson: 15th and 18th centuries. Devastated during the War of Vendée.

Demography

See also
Communes of the Vendée department

References

External links

 Official site
 Ecole Privée
 Course des As

Communes of Vendée